Little London and Woodhouse is an electoral ward of Leeds City Council in Leeds, West Yorkshire, covering the urban areas of Little London and Woodhouse to the north of the city centre. It was created in advance of the 2018 council election.

Councillors 

 indicates seat up for election.
* indicates current incumbent councillor.

Elections since 2018

May 2022

May 2021

May 2019

May 2018

Notes

References

Wards of Leeds